Win Sports is a Colombian pay television sports channel that was launched on 29 November 2012. The channel's programming consists of news reporting, live programs and broadcasts of the Colombian football Categoría Primera A, Categoría Primera B, Copa Colombia and some Colombia national team matches, as well as Davis Cup.

In September 2019, following Radamel Falcao García's arrival to Galatasaray, the channel announced that it had acquired broadcast rights to the Turkish Süper Lig.

In September 2020, Win Sports broadcast the German Bundesliga. Not only that, Win Sports also broadcast the Super Cup as the part of DFL broadcasting rights package contract

References

External links 

 Official Website

RCN Televisión
Television networks in Colombia
Television stations in Colombia
Sports television networks
Television channels and stations established in 2012